Kiltooris Lough is a freshwater lake in the northwest of Ireland. It is located in southwest County Donegal near Dawros Bay.

Geography and hydrology
Kiltooris Lough is oligotrophic.

Natural history
Fish species in Kiltooris Lough include salmon, three-spined stickleback and the critically endangered European eel. Kiltooris Lough is part of the West of Ardara/Maas Road Special Area of Conservation.

See also
List of loughs in Ireland

References

Kiltooris